The National Credit Corporation was an organization created in 1931 in the United States by President Herbert Hoover's administration to try to stop bank failure stemming from the Great Depression, and was a forerunner of the Reconstruction Finance Corporation.

History
The "$500,000,000 bankers' pool was set up to help "save hundreds of small banks throughout the county." The Corporation attempted to convince large surviving banks to loan money to failing banks as a solution to bank runs. The president of the Corporation was Mortimer N. Buckner, the chairman of the New York Trust Company and president of the New York Clearing House.

Loans were supposed to be ready in October 1931, which lead to an increase in the "tone of confidence."

In November 1931, the New York State Banking Department approved a merger between the Bank of America Safe Deposit Company into the National City Safe Deposit Company under the latter's name with an authorization certificate from the Corporation for $2,000,000 capital.

By December 1931, President Buckner stated that the Corporation was "functioning in every one of the twelve Federal Reserve Districts" and had granted all loans asked by banks. All "needed funds had been supplied by loans to the corporation on the part of the large New York City banks without the necessity of issuing a call for payment by member banks of part of their subscriptions to the corporation's gold notes."

On January 14, 1932, however, Buckner "issued a call for payment of a second installment of 10 per cent of subscriptions to the gold notes of the corporation." The $50,000,000 call, brought the total payments made to about $100,000,000, or one-fifth of the corporation's subscribed funds.  Later that same month, the Corporation issued another call for payment of the third installment of 10 per cent, or approximately $50,000,000, on subscriptions to its gold notes payable at the Federal Reserve Bank in each district. At the same time as the third call, it was noted that after "the Reconstruction Finance Corporation begins functioning, it is understood it will take over the activities of the National Credit Corporation. When the latter was formed, it was the consensus that it would be dissolved as soon as possible after legislation had been enacted to permit the Federal Government to render such services."

By the end of March 1932, the Corporation had paid off $20,250,000, or roughly 15 percent of notes. By mid-April 1932, the Corporation announced a third repayment of part of the funds subscribed to it by banks throughout the country, leaving $79,775,000 of its notes outstanding.

Analysis
Many large banks did not believe that investing in failing banks would be secure, so most of them did not support the failing banks. Banks that did provide loans would require that the failing banks put up their most valuable assets as collateral, which would partially reimburse the losses of the loaning bank in case the borrowing bank could not repay the loan.

See also
Reconstruction Finance Corporation

References

Financial services companies of the United States